Sishui Township is a township in Longsheng Various Nationalities Autonomous County, Guangxi, China.

Etymology
The name "Sishui" is named after the intersection of four streams, namely Zhailong Stream, Yandi Stream, Pannei Stream  and Yitan Stream.

Administrative division
As of 2016, the township is divided into nine villages:
 Zhoujia 
 Ximen 
 Sanshe 
 Batan 
 Sishui 
 Pannei 
 Maluo 
 Licha 
 Licai

History
In the Qing dynasty (1644–1911), it belonged to the Dongtuan .

It was incorporated as a township in 1933.

After the founding of the Communist State in 1949, it came under the jurisdiction of the East District and soon came under the jurisdiction of the First District in October 1952. The Sishui Commune was set up in May 1961. And its name was restored as Sishui Township in July of the following year.

On June 6, 2019, the villages of Pannei and Zhoujia was listed among the fifth group of "List of Traditional Villages in China" by the State Council of China.

Geography
The township is situated at northeastern Longsheng Various Nationalities Autonomous County. It is surrounded by Madi Township and Weijiang Township on the north, Lejiang Town on the west, Jiangdi Township on the east, and Longsheng Town on the south.

The Sang River, a tributary of the Xun River, passes through the town northeast to southwest.

Economy
Tourism is a significant part of the economy.

Tourist attractions
The Baimian Yao Village is a famous scenic spot in China.

Transportation
The County Road X144 runs through the town.

References

Bibliography

Townships of Guilin